Bourganeuf (Limousin: Borgon Nuòu) is a commune in the Creuse department in the Nouvelle-Aquitaine region in central France.

Geography

History
The year 1103 saw the village become home to the Knights of St John, who built a castle here. 
Prince Cem Sultan, pretender to the throne of the Ottoman Empire, was kept prisoner here in the fifteenth century. In 1886, the commune was the third place in all of France to be supplied with power using hydroelectricity. Thanks to French engineer, Marcel Deprez, the waterfalls of the river were harnessed to light up the streets, mairie, shops and cafes.

Population

Sights

 The church of St.Pierre, dating from the twelfth century.
 The church of St.Jean, dating from the fifteenth century.
 The remains of a 12th-century castle.
 Four chapels.
 A museum of electricity.
 The archaeological museum in the Zizim(Cem) tower.

Personalities
 Martin Nadaud,  politician was born in the hamlet of La Martinèche in 1815.
 Thierry Ardisson, television producer and animator, was born here in 1949.
 René Viviani, politician, was born here in 1863.
 Michel Riffaterre, French literary critic and theorist born 1924.

International relations
Bourganeuf is twinned with:
 Zirndorf, Germany

See also
Communes of the Creuse department

References

External links

Tourisme Office website  

Communes of Creuse
County of La Marche